Li Dashuang (born 1 November 1973 in Xiantao, Hubei) is a Chinese artistic gymnast and twin brother of Li Xiaoshuang.

He won s silver medal as a member of the team from China at the 1992 Summer Olympics.

References

External links
 
 
 

1973 births
Living people
Chinese male artistic gymnasts
Gymnasts at the 1992 Summer Olympics
Olympic gymnasts of China
Olympic silver medalists for China
People from Xiantao
Olympic medalists in gymnastics
Twin sportspeople
Chinese twins
Gymnasts from Hubei
Asian Games medalists in gymnastics
Gymnasts at the 1994 Asian Games
Asian Games gold medalists for China
Asian Games silver medalists for China
Medalists at the 1994 Asian Games
Medalists at the 1992 Summer Olympics
Medalists at the World Artistic Gymnastics Championships
20th-century Chinese people